Neil Shaka Hislop CM (born 22 February 1969) is a retired footballer who played as a goalkeeper. Born in England, he played for them at under-21 level before representing Trinidad and Tobago at senior international level.

The majority of his career was spent in the top division in England where he was a part of the Newcastle United team which finished second in the Premier League for two successive seasons under Kevin Keegan's first tenure. Before this, he played for Reading, where he was on the losing side in the First Division play-offs despite finishing second overall (the only occasion on which second place was not an automatic promotion position). He later played for West Ham United on two occasions (receiving an FA Cup runners-up medal during his second season in 2006) and also for Portsmouth (where he won the First Division in 2002/03).

Hislop was eligible to play for both England and Trinidad and Tobago. He initially played for the England U-21 team and was on the bench for a full International against Chile, but in the end opted to play for Trinidad and Tobago. A dispute with the national team ruled him out of contention for several years, but he returned to play and starred in the country's first ever World Cup appearance in 2006.

Hislop is now working for sports news and broadcasting service ESPN where he is most often seen as a commentator on ESPN FC. He had also briefly worked as a goalkeeping coach for the football team at Quinnipiac University.

Club career

Early career
At an early age, Hislop wanted to be a striker, but was thrust in goal as he was the tallest player on his team. He eventually grew to just under 6'5" in height. After graduating from St. Mary's College in Trinidad, Hislop earned a scholarship to play college soccer at Howard University in the United States and led his team to the NCAA Final as a freshman starter. He graduated from Howard with honours with a degree in Mechanical Engineering. During this time, he interned at NASA.

Reading
Shortly after graduating, Hislop was spotted by a scout from Reading at a friendly indoor match against Aston Villa of the Premier League. He went on to sign professional forms with Reading for the 1992–93 season and remained there for two more years. While there, he established himself as a firm fan favourite after an uncertain start, twice earning the club's "Player of the Year" award. He was instrumental in Reading's rise from the third tier of English football to the brink of the Premier League, where he narrowly missed out on promotion following a 4–3 defeat to Bolton Wanderers in the 1995 play-off final, and was voted the club's Player of the Season in 1994–95. Hislop was one of many Reading players to move that summer of 1995, signing with Newcastle United for £1.575m. In a poll to compile the Royals' greatest-ever XI, Hislop was voted the best goalkeeper with 46.7% of the vote ahead of Steve Death and Marcus Hahnemann. He was also voted joint third along with Death in a poll to decide the club's 'Player of the Millennium'.

Newcastle United
Hislop's first season at Newcastle United was spent battling with incumbent goalkeeper Pavel Srníček for the starting role. After starting strongly and being the starter through until December, Hislop suffered an injury that allowed Srníček to regain the starting role that he held for the remainder of the season as Newcastle blew a 12-point lead in January to finish the season in second place.

In 1996–97, Hislop remained on the bench, having to watch Srníček tend the nets until approximately the same time the previous season. A perceived dip in form and a number of mistakes from Srníček allowed Hislop to take the starting role back again and he made only his second league start of the year in a 7–1 defeat of Tottenham Hotspur. Hislop successfully retained the starting position as Newcastle pipped Arsenal and Liverpool to second place on goal difference at the end of the season.

Hislop's role further came under threat when new manager Kenny Dalglish opted to purchase a former player of his own from Blackburn Rovers. Dalglish brought in Shay Given, costing £1.5 million, and a season-long battle for the number one spot ensued between the two goalkeepers. Given initially started the season, but after a string of defeats and five games without a win, Dalglish went back to Hislop in November and he stayed there until an injury in February allowed Given back into the frame. With his contract running out, and having not yet managed to play a full season at Newcastle, Hislop chose to leave on a free transfer.

West Ham United
West Ham United had operated a "goalkeeper by committee" approach the previous season, seeing first Luděk Mikloško, then Craig Forrest, then Bernard Lama hold the starting role. With Mikloško now with Queens Park Rangers and with the team being unable to secure Lama beyond his three-month loan, Harry Redknapp snapped up Hislop and installed him as first choice goalkeeper.

In 1998–99, Hislop's first season saw him provide excellent service to the team, culminating in winning the "Hammer of the Year" award at the first attempt. His following season seemed to be following suit until he broke his leg in a match against Bradford City. The game saw young Stephen Bywater make his league debut in a 5–4 victory, but signalled the end of Hislop's season.

Hislop returned the following year in 2000–01 but in a tumultuous season, he saw his manager fired, and two of the club's most promising players in Rio Ferdinand and Frank Lampard sold on. His performances were strong in an unsettled team. However, new manager Glenn Roeder purchased the unsettled David James from Aston Villa, who had publicly fallen foul of his manager John Gregory. The deal was seen as a coup for West Ham, though it resigned Hislop to the bench for what was seen to be his final season with the club as James (a year younger) was intended to be the obvious long-term option.

However, before the 2001–02 season could even start, James tore his knee ligaments on England-duty after a collision with Martin Keown. The injury ruled James out for the first three months of the season. Hislop instantly stepped back into his starting role and kept five clean sheets in his 12 appearances that year for the club (though he also featured in the back to back drubbings from Everton 5–0 and Blackburn Rovers 7–1. However, James reclaimed the starting role, and on 1 July 2002, Hislop left the club on a free transfer.

Portsmouth
Hislop joined Portsmouth after Harry Redknapp became their new manager. He quickly asserted himself as the starter in the side that won the First Division title, ensuring automatic promotion to the Premier League. In recognition of his exploits for the season he was named in the First Division's 'Team of the Year' and remained first choice for the next two seasons in the Premiership, despite competition from Harald Wapenaar and later, Jamie Ashdown. In January 2005, following the replacement of Redknapp as manager, his replacement Velimir Zajec signed Greek international Konstantinos Chalkias and Hislop faced more competition for a place on the team.

Following the appointment of a new manager Alain Perrin, Hislop failed to regain his starting place in favour of ex-Liverpool keeper Sander Westerveld, and when his contract expired in June 2005, he was released by the club.

Return to West Ham
On 29 July 2005, Hislop rejoined West Ham as experienced cover along with Jimmy Walker for new signing Roy Carroll, allowing Stephen Bywater to go out on loan. Carroll started strongly but a back injury saw Hislop make occasional appearances through the season until Christmas. In January, Carroll's injury forced him to the physio's table once again, and Hislop stepped back into the fold as the starter (rotating with Walker). He featured in every FA Cup game as the team made its way to the final against Liverpool, keeping seven clean sheets in 27 appearances. The FA Cup Final finished 3–3 after a late equaliser from Steven Gerrard in the 91st minute. Hislop saving Sami Hyypiä's penalty was not enough for his team as Liverpool won the game 3–1 on penalty kicks after Anton Ferdinand missed the final West Ham spot kick of the day.

FC Dallas
On 5 July 2006, Hislop signed for Major League Soccer team FC Dallas in the United States. After suffering a back injury, Hislop left FC Dallas and retired from professional football in August 2007.

International career

Youth

Hislop was a youth international for Trinidad and Tobago. He had played in three games for Trinidad and Tobago before 1989.

In 1992, he was called up to the Trinidad national football team but was an unused substitute in three games. In May 1995, he said that he would prefer to play for England as he was born and raised there, and the standard of competition was higher.

England

Hislop was called up for England against Chile at Wembley Stadium in February 1998. A month later, at the age of 29, he was one of three over-age players selected to play for the England U-21 side against Switzerland.

Trinidad and Tobago

Eventually, Hislop chose to represent Trinidad and Tobago at the senior level. He played a total of 26 times for the Twin Island nation, also captaining the team in five matches.

Hislop had announced his retirement from international football in 2004, citing the long journeys between England and the Caribbean as a factor, but returned to the national team to aid them in the 2006 FIFA World Cup Qualifiers at the request of the Trinidad and Tobago national team management. In 2005, he was part of the Trinidad and Tobago side that qualified for the 2006 World Cup with a victory over Bahrain. The draw for the World Cup placed them in Group B alongside Sweden, Paraguay and England. On 10 June 2006, Hislop played in the Trinidad and Tobago national team's first ever World Cup match, a 0–0 draw against Sweden, replacing Kelvin Jack who suffered a calf injury in the warm-up. Writing in The Times, he would call the occasion 'the proudest day of his career'.

Coaching career
On 17 March 2009, Hislop signed a contract to be an assistant coach while primarily working with the goalkeepers of the Quinnipiac University football team. After a brief period he resigned as coach due to his media commitments with ESPN.

Media work
In 2008, Hislop began a weekly blog covering Major League Soccer for the British newspaper The Guardian's website. He currently works as a commentator on ESPN FC TV and in addition to commentary he has also interviewed several major footballing figures, including his former club manager Harry Redknapp after his move from Portsmouth to Tottenham Hotspur, USA international goalkeeper Kasey Keller, and Portuguese manager José Mourinho after he led Chelsea to the Premier League title in 2015.

Personal life
Hislop married his wife, Desha, in 1995. He is the cousin of American sprint athlete Natasha Hastings. He has 5 children.

His brother Kona played for Livingston and Hartlepool.

Career statistics
(C.S. = Clean Sheets)
(Con. = Conceded)

1 – includes FA Cup and U.S. Open Cup

2 – includes EFL Cup and MLS Cup Playoffs
3 – includes UEFA Cup, Intertoto Cup and North American SuperLiga
4 – includes Charity Shield and Football League Trophy
5 – all of Hislop booking record, but coincidental all of the record from league appearances

Honours
Howard Bison
 NCAA Division I Championship runner-up: 1988
NCAA Tournament College Cup: 2008

Reading
Football League Second Division: 1993–94
Football League First Division runner-up: 1994–95

Newcastle United
FA Cup runner-up: 1997–98

West Ham United
UEFA Intertoto Cup: 1999
FA Cup runner-up: 2005–06

Portsmouth
Football League First Division: 2002–03

Individual
PFA Team of the Year: 1994–95 First Division, 2002–03 First Division
Chaconia Medal in gold: 2006
 Freedom of the City of Newcastle upon Tyne: 13 May 2022

Awards
In April 2005, Hislop was named the inaugural winner of the PFA Special Merit Award for his services to football. He has been a pioneer of football's 'Show Racism The Red Card' Campaign. He was also inducted into Howard University's Athletic Hall of Fame, only the fifth Association Football player to be so honoured.

Following the Trinidad and Tobago national team's inspirational performance in the World Cup, Hislop and his teammates were awarded the Chaconia Medal in gold, the second highest national award for Trinidad and Tobago. He is entitled to add the 'CM' suffix to his name, as and when desired.

In 2007, Hislop received the Alexander B. Chapman Award from the Trinidad and Tobago Olympic Committee for outstanding contribution to sport and the promotion of Olympic ideals. He is a member of the Professional Footballer's Association's Roll of Honour, joining Pelé with the distinction of being the only two non-British members.

On 10 July 2008, Hislop became the first member of the Trinidad and Tobago World Cup squad to be inducted into his country's Sporting Hall of Fame.

It was announced on 23 February 2022 that He was to be awarded the Freedom of the City of Newcastle upon Tyne.

References

External links

Article by Michael Lewis in FIFA's FANFEST MAGAZINE, October 2006
Shaka Hislop's Guardian Blog

Photos and stats at sporting-heroes.net

'Legends of Sport: SHAKA HISLOP' – Video courtesy of ESPN Soccernet's YouTube Channel
Planet World Cup columnist, Peter Goldstein, on the goalless draw between Sweden and Trinidad & Tobago

1969 births
Living people
Howard Bison men's soccer players
Citizens of Trinidad and Tobago through descent
Trinidad and Tobago footballers
Trinidad and Tobago international footballers
English footballers
Reading F.C. players
Newcastle United F.C. players
Portsmouth F.C. players
West Ham United F.C. players
FC Dallas players
Premier League players
Major League Soccer players
2006 FIFA World Cup players
2000 CONCACAF Gold Cup players
2002 CONCACAF Gold Cup players
2005 CONCACAF Gold Cup players
Association football goalkeepers
Footballers from the London Borough of Hackney
England under-21 international footballers
Howard University alumni
Quinnipiac University people
English sportspeople of Trinidad and Tobago descent
Black British sportspeople
Expatriate soccer players in the United States
Recipients of the Chaconia Medal
English Football League players
Association football commentators
English expatriate sportspeople in the United States
English expatriate footballers
FA Cup Final players